Mayuko (written: , , , ,  or ) is a feminine Japanese given name. Notable people with the name include:

, Japanese actress and voice actress
, Japanese synchronized swimmer and coach
, Japanese actress
, Japanese actress and model
, Japanese handball player
, Japanese entertainer, model and actress
, Japanese violinist
, Japanese-American actress
, Japanese actress
, Japanese politician
, Japanese journalist and media scholar

Fictional characters
Mayuko Kiyokawa, a character from Soar High! Isami
, a character from Ushio and Tora

Japanese feminine given names